Jñānaśrīmitra (fl. 975-1025 C.E.) was an Indian Buddhist philosopher of the epistemological (pramana) tradition of Buddhist philosophy, which goes back to Dignāga and Dharmakīrti . He was also a poet, a dvārapaṇḍita (gate-scholar) of Vikramasila and was the teacher of Ratnakīrti. Jñānaśrīmitra was well known by Hindu and Jain thinkers and was the most significant Buddhist figure of his era.

Thought
Jñanasrimitra's philosophical work focused on Buddhist logic and epistemology (pramana), especially the theory of "exclusion" (apoha) outlined by Dignaga and how it relates to the philosophy of language, meaning and the nature of conceptual thoughts and awareness. In his Apohaprakaraṇa ("Monograph on Exclusion"), Jñanasrimitra elaborates on the theory of apoha and its relation to epistemology as well as defending the theory from Hindu critics. Jñanasrimitra was also a defender of Yogācāra idealism, writing that "this entire triple-world is established to be nothing but consciousness (vijñaptimātra)." 

Jñanasrimitra's Vyāpticarcā (Analysis of Pervasion) focuses on inferential relations termed vyapti (pervasion), the relations between two distinct entities such as smoke and fire. According to Horst Lasic, Jñanasrimitra's position on this topic is that "inference-warranting relations between two distinct entities must be effect-cause relations, and that the presence of such relations can be detected only through a specific sequence of perception and non-apprehension." 

Jñānaśrīmitra was also known as the major defender of the Sākāra school of Yogācāra Buddhism against Ratnākaraśānti, the principal defender of the rival Nirākāra school. He also wrote a treatise against the Hindu creator God (Isvara).

Works
Advaitabindu (Drop of Non-dualism)
Abhisamayahrdaya
Anekacintamani
Anupalabdhirahasya
Apohaprakarana (Monograph on Apoha)
Bhedabhedapariksa
Sākārasiddhiśāstra (A Treatise Proving That Awareness Contains an Image)
Sarvaśabdābhāvacarcā
Isvaradusana (Disproving God)
Karyakaranabhavasiddhi
Ksanabhangadhyaya (On momentariness)
(Adhyardha)Prajnaparamita(naya)satapancasatika 
Sakarasamgrahasutra
Sarvajnasiddhi
Sarvasabdabhavacarca
Vyapticarca
Vrttamâlâstuti
Yoginirnaya(prakarana)

Notes

References
Lawrence J. McCrea, and Parimal G. Patil. Buddhist Philosophy of Language in India: Jnanasrimitra on Exclusion. New York: Columbia University Press, 2010. 216 pp.
Satis Chandra Vidyabhusana; A History of Indian Logic: Ancient, Mediaeval and Modern Schools
Michael Hann (Editor), Mahesh Deokar (Editor); Vrttamalastuti of Jnanasrimitra with Sakyaraksita's Vrttamala(Stuti)Vivrti (Studia Indo Buddhica) Hardcover
Kellner, Jnanasrimitra's Anupalabdhirahasya and Sarvasabdabhavacarca, A critical Edition with A Survey of His Anupalabdhi-Theory; ISBN (Paperback):  3902501065, 9783902501066 
Hahn, M. 1971. Jñānaśrīmitra’s Vrttamâlâstuti. Ein Beispielsammlung zur altindischen Metrik. Nach dem tibetischen Tanjur zusammen mit der mongolischen Version herausgegeben, übersetzt und erläutert. Wiesbaden: Harrassowitz.
Kellner, B. 2007. Jñānaśrīmitra’s Anupalabdhirahasya and Sarvaśabdābhāvacarcā: A Critical Edition with a Survey of His Anupalabdhi-Theory. Wiener Studien zur Tibetologie und Buddhismuskunde no. 67. Vienna: Arbeitskreis für Tibetische und Buddhistische Studien, Universität Wien.

External links

Indian scholars of Buddhism
Mahayana Buddhism writers
Monks of Vikramashila
11th-century Buddhist monks